Rootham is a surname. Notable people with the surname include:

 Cyril Rootham (1875–1938), English composer, educator, and organist
 Graeme Rootham (born 1948), Australian runner
 Helen Rootham, governess of Edith Sitwell
 Jasper Rootham (1910–1990), British civil servant, soldier, banker, writer, and poet